The Roman Catholic Church in Angola is composed of a Latin hierarchy only, which comprises three ecclesiastical provinces, each headed by a Metropolitan Archbishop, and a total of fifteen suffragan dioceses.
 
Although exempt (i.e. immediately subject to the Holy See), the Diocese of São Tomé and Príncipe, an Atlantic island country which shares a Portuguese colonial history (and linguistic legacy) with Angola, is part of the transnational Episcopal Conference of Angola and São Tomé, while neither has a national Episcopal Conference.

Neither country has an Eastern Catholic or pre-diocesan jurisdiction.

There is an Apostolic Nunciature to Angola (in national capital Luanda) as papal diplomatic representation (embassy-level), into which is also vested the Apostolic Nunciature to São Tomé and Príncipe.

Current Latin sees

Angola

Ecclesiastical Province of Huambo 
 Metropolitan Archdiocese of Huambo
Diocese of Benguela
Diocese of Kwito-Bié

Ecclesiastical Province of Luanda 
 Metropolitan Archdiocese of Luanda
Diocese of Cabinda
Diocese of Caxito
Diocese of Mbanza Congo
Diocese of Sumbe
Diocese of Viana

Ecclesiastical Province of Lubango 
 Metropolitan Archdiocese of Lubango
Diocese of Menongue
Diocese of Ondjiva
Diocese of Namibe

Ecclesiastical Province of Malanje 
 Metropolitan Archdiocese of Malanje
Diocese of Ndalatando
Diocese of Uíje

Ecclesiastical Province of Saurimo 
 Metropolitan Archdiocese of Saurímo
Diocese of Dundo
Diocese of Lwena

Exempt Latin in São Tomé and Príncipe 
 Diocese of São Tomé and Príncipe

See also 
 List of Roman Catholic dioceses in Angola by name
 List of Catholic dioceses (structured view)
 Catholic Church in Angola
 Catholic Church in São Tomé and Príncipe

Defunct jurisdictions 
Excluding precursors of present sees (usually pre-diocesan).

There are no titular sees.

In Angola, one was suppressed without (direct) successor :
 Mission sui juris of Cunene

Sources and external links 
 GCatholic.org - data for every section.
 Catholic-Hierarchy

Angola

Catholic dioceses
Catholic dioceses